Dronfield Woodhouse is a district of Dronfield, in North East Derbyshire, England. The area has been inhabited since at least the 11th century (Cowley – pronounced Coaley – Farm, to the south) and its main road, Carr Lane,  features a 13th-century house, formerly Hall Farm. The  19th-century former primary school on Holmesfield Road is now an elderly care home.

Coal mining was an important activity in the village in the 19th and early 20th centuries and the last pit to close was Hurst Hollow in 1947.  The current public house, the Miners' Arms, stands opposite the entrance to one of the former mines. Along with mining went Methodism. The chapel, built in 1848, has recently been converted into a dwelling following its closure. In the immediate post-war period the village had its own post office and general store opposite Hall Farm and there were also two other village shops in Carr Lane.  The building of a number of council houses in the 1950s linked Dronfield Woodhouse to the hamlet of Stubley, which in its turn had already been joined to Dronfield in the period between the two world wars. In the 1960s a large housing development took place in the adjacent Gosforth Valley turning Dronfield Woodhouse into a quiet dormitory settlement for nearby Sheffield and Chesterfield. The surrounding countryside is still readily accessible, however, and the boundary of the Peak District National Park is less than 2 miles to the west.

References

Populated places in Derbyshire
Towns and villages of the Peak District
Dronfield